Druelle (Languedocien: Druèla) is a former commune in the Aveyron department in southern France. On 1 January 2017, it was merged into the new commune Druelle Balsac.

Population

See also
Communes of the Aveyron department

References

Former communes of Aveyron
Aveyron communes articles needing translation from French Wikipedia
Populated places disestablished in 2017